Parliamentary elections were held in Bulgaria on 18 December 1994.  The Democratic Left, the core of which was the Bulgarian Socialist Party, won 125 of the 240 seats, enough to govern without the support of parties from outside the coalition. Voter turnout was 75.3%. Following the election, Socialist Party leader Zhan Videnov became Prime Minister.

Results

References

Bulgaria
Parliamentary
Parliamentary elections in Bulgaria